Mykhailo Sabryha, C.Ss.R. (22 November 1940 – 29 June 2006) was a Ukrainian Greek Catholic hierarch. He was clandestine auxiliary bishop of the Ukrainian Catholic Archeparchy of Lviv from 1986 to 1993 (from 16 January 1991 as titular bishop of Bucellus) and the first eparchial bishop of the new created Ukrainian Catholic Eparchy of Ternopil–Zboriv from 1993 until his death in 2006.

Life 
Born in Bortkiv, Soviet Union (present-day – Lviv Oblast, Ukraine) on 1940 in the Greek-Catholic family of Yosyp and Stefaniya with 3 children. In 1963 he joined the missionary Congregation of the Most Holy Redeemer, because the Communist regime abolished the Greek-Catholic Church. He was professed on 8 November 1971 and was ordained a priest on 24 February 1974 by Archbishop Volodymyr Sterniuk, C.Ss.R. .  After ordination he served in the clandestine parishes of the Western Ukraine.

In 11 October 1986 Fr. Sabryha was consecrated to the Episcopate as auxiliary bishop. The principal and single consecrator was clandestine Archbishop Volodymyr Sterniuk.

In 20 April 1993 he was elected as the first bishop of the new created Ukrainian Catholic Eparchy of Ternopil–Zboriv (until 21 July 2000 it was named as Eparchy of Ternopil).

He suddenly died on 29 June 2006.

References 

1940 births
2006 deaths
20th-century Eastern Catholic bishops
21st-century Eastern Catholic bishops
Bishops of the Eparchy of Ternopil - Zboriv
Ukrainian Eastern Catholics
Redemptorist bishops
20th-century Roman Catholic bishops in Ukraine